Olga Gorelli, (June 14, 1920 Bologna, Italy, died February 18, 2006) was well known for her musical talents as a composer and pianist.

Life and career
Olga Gorelli, maiden name Gratch, immigrated to the United States in 1937 with her family and settled in New Jersey.  She married a physician, and had two children. She was a resident of Pennington, New Jersey.

Gorelli began composing as a child in Italy and her first little piano pieces were published in Italy when she was ten years old. She pursued her music studies in the U.S., graduating from Immaculata College, the Curtis Institute of Music, Smith College, and the Yale University School of Music, and pursued graduate work at the Eastman School of Music.  Her teachers included Rosario Scalero, Gian Carlo Menotti, Quincy Porter, Paul Hindemith, and Darius Milhaud.

Gorelli taught music theory at Hollins College, and piano at Trenton State College.  She also taught privately at her home and composed each morning up until the last weeks of her life.

She has written orchestral and choral pieces, many songs for voice with various instruments, a mass, two operas, two dance dramas, and several works for different combinations of strings, brass, and woodwinds.

Recordings

 Rosenfeld, Jayn and Vas, Meg. "The River." By Olga Gorelli. Jersey Sessions, Volume 2. Composers Guild of New Jersey (CGNJ1290), 1990. CD.
 Cervantes, Ana. "Serenade: I Carry Your Heart With Me." By Olga Gorelli. Amore de la Danza. Ana L. Cervantes and John Baker Recordings (CERV1198), December 1998, July 2002. CD.
 Anderson, William and Wolf, Marc. "Paolo e Francesca." By Olga Gorelli. Hausmusik. 20th Century Chamber Music for the Home. Furious Artisans (FACD6802), 2000. Innova (INNOVA310), 2010. CD.
 Anderson, William and Wolf, Marc. "Silent Moon." By Olga Gorelli. Hausmusik. 20th Century Chamber Music for the Home. Furious Artisans (FACD6802), 2000. Innova (INNOVA310), 2010. CD.
 Anderson, William and Wolf, Marc. "Mechanical Man." By Olga Gorelli. Hausmusik. 20th Century Chamber Music for the Home. Furious Artisans (FACD6802), 2000. Innova (INNOVA310), 2010. CD.

Pedagogical writings
 Manual for teaching music skills. Book 1. With songs by Olga Gorelli. Minneapolis, T.S. Denison. 53p. T.S. Denison & Co. Inc. 27 March 1968; Library of Congress record A97B936. Accessed July 5, 2011.
 Manual for teaching music skills. Book 3. With songs by Olga Gorelli. Minneapolis, T.S. Denison. 65 p. T.S. Denison & Co., Inc. 10 Dec 1968; Library of Congress record A35636. Accessed July 5, 2011.

Notes

External links
 "Lullaby for Olga" ("Acalanto Para Olga") by Luiz Simas dedicated to late composer and pianist Olga Gorelli.   Accessed August 21, 2011.
 "Women Composers on Classical Discoveries". In Praise of Woman - 2006. March 29, 2006. Longing and Song of the Mermaids by Olga Gorelli. Accessed August 21, 2011.
 "Women of Note". Princeton Research Forum. Poem, Cuando Viene La Rimavera? scored by Olga Gorelli, performed by Nancy Herl at Westminster Choir College. Accessed August 21, 2011.
 "Musical Sashimi. An Ondine Repast". Palisades Virtuosi. Saturday, April 1, 2006. Song of the Mermaids by Olga Gorelli. Accessed August 21, 2011.
 "Jayn Rosenfeld, Chamber Coach. Recordings". Composers Guild of New Jersey, New Jersey Sessions Volume 2. The River by Olga Gorelli. Accessed August 21, 2011.
 "New Music Festival". New Jersey Percussion Ensemble. January 26, 1998, William Paterson University, New Jersey. Elegy for Martin (for Chimes & Piano) by Olga Gorelli. Accessed August 21, 2011.
 "2010 Engagements". Doug Miller. July 19 - August 9, 2010. Accessed August 21, 2011. "Recording sessions with Shikantaza for an upcoming collaborative effort with Front Row Seat productions. This collaboration will record selected works by some of the world's notable women composers, poets, and singers, including Olga Gorelli and Sylvia Rexach."
  "Piano Music by Charles Griffin Performed by Ana Cervantes", Musical America Worldwide, October 31, 2008. Accessed August 21, 2011. "Also on the program are works by C.P.E. Bach, American Laurie Altman, William Byrd, Englishman Stephen McNeff, Chopin, Rodolfo Halffter, Russian-Italian Olga Gorelli, Brahms and Mexican Arturo Marquez."
 "Sergio Cardenas Curriculum Vitae". Opera Between the Shadow and the Dream by Olga Gorelli. Accessed August 21, 2011.

1920 births
2006 deaths
American women composers
American composers
Italian emigrants to the United States
People from Pennington, New Jersey
Yale University alumni
Immaculata University alumni
Curtis Institute of Music alumni
Eastman School of Music alumni
Smith College alumni
Pupils of Darius Milhaud
Pupils of Paul Hindemith
20th-century American women musicians